Marco Venturini (born 12 July 1960) is an Italian former sport shooter who competed in the 1992 Summer Olympics, in the 1996 Summer Olympics, the 2000 Summer Olympics, and the 2004 Summer Olympics. He was born in Pistoia.

Career
Venturini won 17 medals at international senior level.

References

External links
 

1960 births
Living people
Italian male sport shooters
Trap and double trap shooters
Olympic shooters of Italy
Shooters at the 1992 Summer Olympics
Shooters at the 1996 Summer Olympics
Shooters at the 2000 Summer Olympics
Shooters at the 2004 Summer Olympics
Olympic bronze medalists for Italy
Olympic medalists in shooting
Medalists at the 1992 Summer Olympics